George Slifkas (born 18 October 1969) is an Australian former association football player.

Playing career

Club career
Slifkas played for Preston Makedonia, Heidelberg United and West Adelaide in the National Soccer League in the late 1980s and early 1990s. From the mid-1990s he dropped down to the Victorian Premier League where he played for the Bulleen Lions, the Thomastown Zebras and the Melbourne Raiders.

International career
At the 1992 Barcelona Olympics Slifkas played four matches as Australia placed fourth.

In 1993 Slifkas made his first and only international appearance for Australia as a substitute in a match against South Korea.

References

1969 births
Australian soccer players
Australia international soccer players
National Soccer League (Australia) players
Olympic soccer players of Australia
Footballers at the 1992 Summer Olympics
Living people
Association football forwards
Heidelberg United FC players
West Adelaide SC players
Preston Lions FC players